Waukenabo Township is a township in Aitkin County, Minnesota, United States.  The population was 316 as of the 2010 census.

Geography

Major highway
  U.S. Highway 169

Lakes
 Baker Lake
 East Lake
 Esquagamah Lake (east three-quarters)
 Packer Lake
 Round Lake
 Sitas Lake
 Waukenabo Lake
 West Lake

Adjacent townships
 Logan Township (east)
 Fleming Township (southeast)
 Morrison Township (south)

Cemeteries
The township contains Waukenabo Cemetery.

Demographics
As of the census of 2000, there were 340 people, 135 households, and 105 families residing in the township.  The population density was 10.3 people per square mile (4.0/km).  There were 429 housing units at an average density of 13.0/sq mi (5.0/km).  The racial makeup of the township was 99.41% White, and 0.59% from two or more races.

There were 135 households, out of which 27.4% had children under the age of 18 living with them, 71.9% were married couples living together, 3.0% had a female householder with no husband present, and 21.5% were non-families. 17.0% of all households were made up of individuals, and 3.7% had someone living alone who was 65 years of age or older.  The average household size was 2.52 and the average family size was 2.83.

In the township the population was spread out, with 21.8% under the age of 18, 6.5% from 18 to 24, 20.9% from 25 to 44, 29.7% from 45 to 64, and 21.2% who were 65 years of age or older.  The median age was 46 years. For every 100 females, there were 123.7 males.  For every 100 females age 18 and over, there were 123.5 males.

The median income for a household in the township was $29,643, and the median income for a family was $30,833. Males had a median income of $36,250 versus $19,327 for females. The per capita income for the township was $13,621.  About 15.5% of families and 13.6% of the population were below the poverty line, including 6.3% of those under age 18 and 19.8% of those age 65 or over.

References
 United States National Atlas
 United States Census Bureau 2007 TIGER/Line Shapefiles
 United States Board on Geographic Names (GNIS)

Townships in Aitkin County, Minnesota
Townships in Minnesota